is a railway station located in Fūren-chō Motomachi, Nayoro, Hokkaidō, Japan. It is operated by the Hokkaido Railway Company.

Lines served
Hokkaido Railway Company
Sōya Main Line

Adjacent stations

External links
Ekikara Time Table - JR Fūren Station (Japanese)

Railway stations in Hokkaido Prefecture
Railway stations in Japan opened in 1903